First-seeded Dorothy Bundy defeated Dorothy Stevenson 6–3, 6–2, in the final to win the women's singles tennis title at the 1938 Australian Championships.

Seeds
The seeded players are listed below. Dorothy Bundy is the champion; others show the round in which they were eliminated.

 Dorothy Bundy (champion)
 Nancye Wynne (semifinals)
 Thelma Coyne (quarterfinals)
 Joan Hartigan (quarterfinals)
 Nell Hopman (semifinals)
 May Hardcastle (quarterfinals)
 Dorothy Stevenson (finalist)
 Do Workman (quarterfinals)

Draw

Key
 Q = Qualifier
 WC = Wild card
 LL = Lucky loser
 r = Retired

Finals

Earlier rounds

Section 1

Section 2

References

External links
 

1938 in women's tennis
1938
1938 in Australian women's sport
Women's Singles